This article contains information about the literary events and publications of 1827.

Events
January – Amhlaoibh Ó Súilleabháin begins his Irish-language diary, later published as Cín Lae Amhlaoibh.
February – Thomas De Quincey's essay On Murder Considered as one of the Fine Arts is published in Blackwood's Magazine.
February 23 – Sir Walter Scott's authorship of the Waverley Novels is first publicly acknowledged at an Edinburgh Theatrical Fund dinner.
February 24 – Samuel Griswold Goodrich copyrights the first of the "Peter Parley" juvenile books in the United States, which will continue until 1860.
April 16 – Nathaniel Willis Senior begins publishing a new magazine for children, The Youth's Companion, in Boston, Massachusetts, weekly from June 6. One of the most enduring of its type, the magazine continues until 1929.
June – John Neal returns to the US after two and a half years in England.
September 4 – The Great Fire of Turku (the largest city in Finland at that time) destroys Finnish archives, including practically all material from Finland's Middle Ages. The library of the Royal Academy of Turku was also destroyed.
October 14 – Ludwig Tieck's Potsdam production of A Midsummer Night's Dream is the first to feature the incidental music composed by Felix Mendelssohn.
unknown dates
Thomas Skinner Sturr's anonymous Richmond, or stories in the life of a Bow Street officer, the earliest collection of detective stories, is published in London by Henry Colburn.
The Swedish theatre director Johan Peter Strömberg establishes what will become the Christiania Theatre in Norway.
John James Audubon begins publication of a 10-volume The Birds of America in the United Kingdom.

New books

Fiction
 Edward Bulwer-Lytton – Falkland
Lady Charlotte Bury – Flirtation
James Fenimore Cooper
The Prairie
The Red Rover
Benjamin Disraeli – Vivian Grey, vol. 2
Thomas Gaspey – Richmond
Émile de Girardin – Émile
Catherine Gore
The Lettre de Cachet
The Reign of Terror
Sarah Josepha Hale – Northwood: Life North and South (U.K. title: A New England Tale) 
Wilhelm Hauff
Jud Süß
Phantasien im Bremer Ratskeller (The Wine-Ghosts of Bremen)
Christian Isobel Johnstone – Elizabeth de Bruce
Sir Thomas Dick Lauder – The Wolf of Badenoch
Jane Webb (anonymously) – The Mummy!: Or a Tale of the Twenty-Second Century
Alessandro Manzoni – I Promessi sposi (The Betrothed)
Sydney, Lady Morgan – The O'Briens and The O'Flaherties
Karoline Pichler – Die Schweden in Prag (The Swedes in Prague)
Sir Walter Scott – Chronicles of the Canongate
Catharine Maria Sedgwick – Hope Leslie
Horatio Smith – Reuben Aspley

Children
Agnes Strickland – The Juvenile Forget Me Not; Or, Cabinet of Entertainment and Instruction

Drama
John Baldwin Buckstone  – Luke the Labourer
Christian Dietrich Grabbe  – Herzog Theodor von Gotland
 Thomas Colley Grattan – Ben Nazir
 Richard Brinsley Peake – Comfortable Lodgings
Victor Hugo – Cromwell

Poetry
Fitz-Greene Halleck – Alnwick Castle, with Other Poems
Heinrich Heine – Buch der Lieder (Book of Songs)
John Keble – The Christian Year
Giacomo Leopardi – Operette Morali
Robert Pollok – The Course of Time
Edgar Allan Poe (as A Bostonian) – Tamerlane and Other Poems (his first poetry collection)
Alexander Pushkin - The Gypsies 
Alfred and Charles Tennyson – Poems by Two Brothers

Non-fiction
Elizabeth Beverley – Veluti in speculum (letters on church singing, theater management, elocution etc.)
Franz Bopp – Ausführliches Lehrgebäude der Sanskritsprache (Detailed System of the Sanskrit Language)
Encyclopædia Edinensis
Henry Hallam – The Constitutional History of England
William Macmichael – The Gold-Headed Cane
John Ayrton Paris – Philosophy in Sport made Science in Earnest: Being an Attempt to Implant in the Young Mind the First Principles of Natural Philosophy by the Aid of the Popular Toys and Sports of Youth
Lady Louisa Stuart – Memoir of Lady Mary Coke

Births
February 17 – Rose Terry Cooke, American author and poet (died 1892)
February 22 – Bhudev Mukhopadhyay, Bengali writer and philosopher (died 1894)
March 3 – H. B. Goodwin, American novelist, poet and educator (died 1893)
March 4 – Henrietta Keddie (Sarah Tytler), Scottish novelist and children's writer (died 1914)
March 25 – Edward Bradley, English novelist and cleric (died 1889)
April 10 – Mary Helen Peck Crane, American activist and writer (died 1891)
April 10 – Lew Wallace, American soldier, politician and novelist (died 1905)
April 16 – Octave Crémazie, pioneering French Canadian poet (died 1879)
June 12 – Johanna Spyri, Swiss children's author (died 1901)
September 13 – Catherine Winkworth, English translator and hymnist (died 1878)
September 18 – John Townsend Trowbridge, American author (died 1916)
probable – Margaret Eleanor Parker, English-born Scottish travel writer, social activist and social reformer (died 1896)

Deaths
February 9 – Emily S. Bouton, American educator, journalist, author and editor (born 1837)
February 18 – Joseph Heinrich Aloysius Gügler, Swiss philosopher and theologian (born 1782)
May 28 – William James, English naval historian (born 1780)
July 3 – David Davis (Castellhywel), Welsh minister and poet (born 1745)
July 22 – Ludwig Heinrich von Jakob, German economist (born 1759)
July 27 – Fredrique Eleonore Baptiste, Swedish-Finnish playwright 
August 12 – William Blake, English poet and artist (born 1757)
September 15 – Robert Pollok, Scottish poet (born c. 1798)
October 10 – Ugo Foscolo, Greek-born Italian dramatist and poet (born 1778)
November – Alethea Lewis, English novelist (born 1749)
November 18 – Wilhelm Hauff, German poet and novelist (born 1802)
December 15 – Helen Maria Williams, English novelist, poet and translator from French (born 1759)
December 26 – Feliks Jarońskij, Polish philosopher (born 1777)

Awards
Newdigate Prize – Robert Stephen Hawker

References

 
Years of the 19th century in literature